Hans Olle Lennart Andersson (born 28 January 1948) is a Swedish country singer and songwriter, whose albums had chart success in Sweden during the 1980s.

He took part in Melodifestivalen 2015 in a bid to represent Sweden in Eurovision Song Contest 2015 with "Guld och gröna skogar". He came 3rd in semi-final 4, which took place on 28 February 2015 in Örebro, and qualified for the Second Chance round (Andra chansen) on 7 March 2015, where he dueled against Kristin Amparo. He won the duel and thus went to the final, where he finished 4th with at total of 78 points, of which 10 came from the international juries and the remaining 68 from the voters in Sweden.

On 30 September 2016, Sveriges Television (SVT) announced that Andersson will host all six shows of Melodifestivalen 2017 alongside Clara Henry and David Lindgren.

Discography

Albums

Singles

References

External links

 

1948 births
Living people
Swedish guitarists
Male guitarists
Swedish male singers
Swedish country singers
Melodifestivalen contestants of 2015